Bhavana Balsavar (born 21 October 1975) is an Indian film, stage and television actress. She is the part of silent comedy series, Gutur Gu (2010).

Personal life
Bhavana is the daughter of Hindi cinema actress Shubha Khote and her husband, Mr. D.M.Balsavar. She has two siblings, including Ashwin Balsavar, a sound recordist. Bhavana's mother comes from a family with strong film connections. Bhavana's maternal uncle (Shubha's brother) is the noted actor Viju Khote and her maternal grandfather was the stage and silent-era actor Nandu Khote. Also, Nandu Khote's older brother was the husband of Durga Khote, famous actress of yesteryears. Thus, Bhavana is a grand-niece of Durga Khote..

Bhavana studied at Arya Vidya Mandir High School in Bandra, Mumbai and was an outstanding student. In fact, she was an ICSE topper in standard 10. She is a graduate in dress designing and fashion coordination from the SNDT Women's University, Juhu, Mumbai.

In 2002, after dating him for thirteen years, Bhavana married the actor Karan Shah. Karan Shah is the nephew of actress and socialite Tina Ambani, who is his mother's younger sister. This is Karan's second marriage and he is the father of two children with his first wife.

FilmographyDhoom Dadakka (Angoori)Sukhi Sansarachi 12 SutreAamchya Sarkhe Aamhich (Shubhangi)

TelevisionPhir Bhi Dil Hai Hindustani (2003) (Saraswati/Saru)Dekh Bhai Dekh (Sunita Deewan) (1993)Zabaan Sambhalke  (Ms. Vijaya) (1993)No Problem (1993)Tehkikaat (1994) as Maria D'Souza Episode no 16/17 Mystery Behind Missing Girl
KaramchandIdhar Udhar (Katie) Asmaan Se AageOh DaddyAskanshaMrityuAtitJaane Mera Jigar Kidhar Gaya Ji (1996–1997)Oh Daddy (1996)Hum Aapke Hai Woh (1997)Dam Dama Dam (1998)Hera Pheri (1999)Jugal Bandi Hum Sab Baraati (2004) as Bhanu (Chandu's Wife)Gutur Gu as (Babita Kumar) (2010–2012)Adaalat (Lawyer) (2010)
 Lakhon Mein Ek – episodic role (2012)
 Gutar Gu 2 as (Bhavna Ahuja) (2012–2013)
 Satrangee Sasural as Harpreet (2014–2016)
 Gutar Gu 3 as Babita Kumar (2014)
 Belan Wali Bahu as Premlata Awasthi (2018)
 Gudiya Hamari Sabhi Pe Bhari as Babli Bua (2020)
 Spy Bahu as Minal Kotadiya (2022)

Drama/Theatre
 Andhyug''

References

External links
 
 

Living people
Marathi actors
Indian television actresses
Actresses in Marathi cinema
Indian stage actresses
1975 births